Patrick Fleming was an Irish highwayman and the subject of poems and songs in Ireland. He was executed on April 24, 1650.

Life
Fleming was born into a family of potato farmers at Athlone. His mother and father leased the land at a rate of 15 shillings a year. They lived in a one-room house with Patrick and his eight siblings.

At age 13, he went into service with Elizabeth Nugent, Countess of Kildare. He reportedly neglected his studies and displayed insolence, being discharged from her service. He was soon taken into household service by the Earl of Antrim. Fleming eventually fell out of favour after discovering the household priest sleeping in an obscene pose and bringing in other household staff as witnesses. The Earl, however, chose to believe the priest and discharged Patrick in disgrace. Before leaving, Patrick was alleged to have stolen money and items worth 200 pounds. He then fled to  Athenry, in the province of Connaught, hiding out for under two weeks until he felt safe enough to continue to Dublin. Fleming joined a house robbing gang and was reputed to have robbed more houses in the six years of operation than had ever been robbed in Dublin at the time.

When his notoriety made it dangerous for him to remain in Dublin, he set out for the Bog of Allen, becoming a highwayman. He attacked both rich and poor alike, threatening his victims with death should they not cooperate. It is reported that he not only threatened death but killed or maimed some of those he had robbed. He also formed a gang in the Barnsmoor Mountain area near the Colorockedie woods, with them robbing over 125 men and women. Some of his gang members were captured and hanged. He was reputed to have robbed notable people of the time such as the Archbishop of Armagh and the Bishop of Raphoe as they traveled together in one coach. He also robbed the Archbishop of Tuam, reportedly taking 1,000 pounds from him. Fleming set upon Lady Baltimore who was traveling with her four-year-old son, who he kidnapped and demanded a ransom stating to her that if the ransom was not paid in 24 hours he would "cut the young puppy's throat and make a pie of him".

Fleming was apprehended in Munster after robbing a nobleman of 250 pounds and transported to prison in Cork. He was able to escape from a chimney in the jail and avoided being hanged there.

He continued for some years with some notably vicious robberies, reportedly murdering five men, two women and a boy of 14 years. He also maimed and injured others including Sir Donagh O'Brien, who resisted the robbery attempt and had his nose, lips and ears cut off by Fleming.

Fleming was turned in to the authorities by the landlord of a house he and his accomplices frequented. The landlord soaked the gang's firearms with water prior to the sheriff arriving with his men to arrest Fleming and his cohorts. Fleming and fourteen of his men were taken to Dublin and hanged on April 24, 1650. His body was hanged in chains inside the city of Dublin.

Legend
Poems have been written about his exploits named The Ballad of Patrick Flemming or Patrick Flemmen he was a Valiant Soldier. These poems are said to be the foundation for the Irish ballad and much covered song  Whiskey in the Jar.

References and sources
Notes

Sources
 Patrick Flemming

1650 deaths
Executed serial killers
Irish outlaws
Irish serial killers
Male serial killers
People executed by England and Wales by hanging